Clifford A. Carpenter (March 2, 1915 – January 9, 2014) was an American actor who appeared in radio, television and films.

Career
In 1937, Carpenter began his professional career on the radio serial Terry and the Pirates. The show was adapted from the comic strip of the same name. He provided the voice for the main character Terry Lee. He played Curtis Bassett in the radio serial drama Prairie Folks.

Carpenter debuted on Broadway in Eve of St. Mark in 1942. He also played in Inherit the Wind, Sunrise at Campobello and The Andersonville Trial.

After the start of World War II, Carpenter enlisted in the United States Army. He later became blacklisted due to his support for Philip Loeb, who had been included in Red Channels.

Carpenter worked sporadically between the 1950s and 1970s, making appearances in television series such as The Patty Duke Show, The Defenders, Hawk, Coronet Blue and Great Performances. In later life, he had a small role in Synecdoche, New York, directed by Charlie Kaufman and starring Philip Seymour Hoffman, and made recurring appearances on The Daily Show with Jon Stewart, playing a 22-year-old man who aged prematurely as a consequence of watching Sean Hannity nightly on Fox News. He provided the voice of Odin Andersson in the video games Alan Wake (2010) and Alan Wake's American Nightmare (2012).

Personal life
Carpenter lived with actress and screenwriter Jean Rouverol, another former blacklisted artist, for several years. He died in New Milford, Connecticut in 2014, aged 98, from natural causes.

Filmography

Film

Television

Video games

References

External links
 
 

1915 births
2014 deaths
American male television actors
American male voice actors
Male actors from San Francisco